Delta Goodrem is an Australian recording artist, who first became famous for her role as Nina Tucker on Neighbours. She was signed to Sony Music Australia from the age of 15. Goodrem has released five studio albums, Innocent Eyes (2003), Mistaken Identity (2004), Delta (2007),Child of the Universe (2012), and "Wings of the Wild" (2016).

Goodrem has won and been nominated for numerous awards. They include the APRA Award, ARIA Music Award, MTV Australia Award and the Nickelodeon Australian Kids' Choice Awards.

Order of Australia
In 2022, Goodrem was appointed a Member of the Order of Australia (AM) in the 2022 Australia Day Honours for "significant service to the not-for-profit sector, and to the performing arts".

Annual Australian DVD Awards
Goodrem won this award once in 2004.

|-
|2004
|"Delta"
|Best Music DVD
|

ARIA Awards

ARIA Music Awards 

The ARIA Music Awards are a set of annual awards ceremonies sponsored by Australian Recording Industry Association (ARIA), which recognise excellence, innovation, and achievement across all genres of Australian music. Goodrem has won nine awards from twenty-six nominations.

|-
|rowspan="13"|2003
|Innocent Eyes
|Best Female Artist
|
|-
|"Born to Try"
|Single of the Year
|
|-
|"Born to Try"
| ARIA Award for Breakthrough Artist - Single
|
|-
|Innocent Eyes
|Breakthrough Artist - Album
|
|-
|Innocent Eyes
|Best Pop Release
|
|-
|"Born to Try"
| ARIA Award for Highest Selling Single
|
|-
|"Lost Without You"
|Highest Selling Single
|
|-
|"Innocent Eyes"
|Highest Selling Single
|
|-
|Innocent Eyes
|Highest Selling Album
|
|-
|Innocent Eyes
|Album of the Year
|
|-
|David Nicholas – Innocent Eyes
|Producer of the Year
|
|-
|Vince Pizzinga – "Will You Fall for Me"
|Engineer of the Year
|
|-
|Jenny Sullivan of Sony Music Design – Innocent Eyes
|Best Cover Art
|
|-
|rowspan="4"|2004
|Innocent Eyes
|Highest Selling Album
|
|-
|"Not Me, Not I"
|Best Pop Release
|
|-
|"Not Me, Not I"
|Best Female Artist
|
|-
|"Predictable"
|Highest Selling Single
|
|-
|rowspan="2"|2005
|"Almost Here"
|Highest Selling Single
|
|-
|Mistaken Identity
|Highest Selling Album
|
|-
|rowspan="2"|2008
|"In This Life"
|Highest Selling Single
|
|-
|Delta
|Highest Selling Album
|
|-
|2012
|"Sitting on Top of the World"
|Song of the Year
|
|-
|2015
|Anthony Rose - "Wings"
|Best Video
|
|-
|rowspan="3"|2016
|Kristen Doyle – Wings of the Wild
|Best Cover Art
|
|-
|Anthony Rose – "Dear Life"
|Best Video
|
|-
|Wings of the Wild
|Best Female Artist
|

ARIA No. 1 Awards

The ARIA No. 1 Chart Awards are given to Australian recording artists who have achieved a number-one single or album on the ARIA Charts. Goodrem has won 14 of these awards.

|-
|2003
|Innocent Eyes
|Gaining No. 1 position on the ARIA album charts
|
|-
|2003
|"Born to Try"
|Gaining No. 1 position on the ARIA single charts
|
|-
|2003
|"Lost Without You"
|Gaining No. 1 position on the ARIA singles charts
|
|-
|2003
|"Innocent Eyes"
|Gaining No. 1 position on the ARIA single charts
|
|-
|2004
|Innocent Eyes
|Gaining No. 1 position on the ARIA album charts
|
|-
|2004
|"Not Me, Not I"
|Gaining No. 1 position on the ARIA single charts
|
|-
|2004
|"Predictable"
|Gaining No. 1 position on the ARIA single charts
|
|-
|2005
|Mistaken Identity
|Gaining No. 1 position on the ARIA album charts
|
|-
|2005
|"Out of the Blue"
|Gaining No. 1 position on the ARIA single charts
|
|-
|2005
|"Almost Here"
|Gaining No. 1 position on the ARIA single charts
|
|-
|2007
|"In This Life"
|Gaining No. 1 position on the ARIA single charts
|
|-
|2007
|Delta
|Gaining No. 1 position on the ARIA album charts
|
|-
|2010
|Believe Again: Australian Tour 2009
|Gaining No. 1 position on the ARIA DVD charts
|
|-
|2015
|"Wings"
|Gaining No. 1 position on the ARIA single charts
|
|-
|2016
|Wings of the Wild
|Gaining No. 1 position on the ARIA album charts
|
|-
|2021
|Bridge Over Troubled Dreams
|Gaining No. 1 position on the ARIA album charts
|
|-

APRA Awards
The APRA Awards are presented annually from 1982 by the Australasian Performing Right Association (APRA).

|-
|rowspan=4|2004
|Herself
|Breakthrough Award
|
|-
|"Innocent Eyes"
|Song of the Year
|
|-
|"Born to Try"
|Most Performed Australian Work
|
|-
|"Innocent Eyes"
|Most Performed Australian Work
|
|-
|2005
|"Predictable"
|Most Performed Australian Work
|
|-
|rowspan=3|2013
|rowspan=2|"Sitting on Top of the World" 
|Pop Work of the Year
|
|-
|Most Played Australian Work
|
|-
| "Wish You Were Here"
| Song of the Year
|
|-

Channel [V] Awards
The [V] Oz Artist of the Year award is presented annually by Channel V Australia. Channel V choose the original nominees, with public vote deciding the final ten, final four and overall winner.

|-
| style="text-align:center;"|2003 
| style="text-align:left;"|Herself 
| [V] Oz Artist of the Year
| 
|-
| style="text-align:center;"|2004
| style="text-align:left;"|Herself 
| [V] Oz Artist of the Year
| 
|-
| style="text-align:center;"|2012
| style="text-align:left;"|Herself 
| [V] Oz Artist of the Year
| 
|-
| style="text-align:center;"|2013
| style="text-align:left;"|Herself 
| [V] Oz Artist of the Year
|

Helpmann Awards
The Helpmann Awards is an awards show, celebrating live entertainment and performing arts in Australia, presented by industry group Live Performance Australia since 2001. Note: 2020 and 2021 were cancelled due to the COVID-19 pandemic.
 

! 
|-
| 2006
| Delta Goodrem: The Visualise Tour 2005
| Helpmann Award for Best Performance in an Australian Contemporary Concert
| 
|
|-

Logie Awards
The TV Week Logie Awards are the Australian television industry awards, which have been presented annually since 1959. Goodrem has been nominated for three Logies winning once.

|-
|2003
|Nina Tucker(Neighbours)
|Silver Logie for Most Popular New Talent
|
|-
|2004
|Nina Tucker(Neighbours)
|Silver Logie for Most Popular Actress
|
|-
|2004
|Herself
|Gold Logie for Most Popular Personality on Australian Television
|

Mo Awards
The Mo Awards are long-running annual Australian entertainment industry awards. They recognise achievements in live entertainment in Australia. Goodrem has won one award.

|-
| 2003
| Herself 
| Australian Performer of the Year 
|

MTV Video Music Awards

|-
| 2003
| "Born to Try"
| International Viewers' Choice Award
|

MTV Australia Video Music Awards
The MTV Australia Awards is an awards ceremony presented by channel MTV Australia to honour the best music videos of both local and international acts. Goodrem has won three awards from five nominations.

|-
|2005
|Herself
|Best Female Artist
|
|-
|2005
|Herself
|Pepsi Viewers Choice Award
|
|-
|2005
|Mistaken Identity"
|Best Pop Video
|
|-
|2005
|"Out of the Blue"
|Best Dressed video
|
|-
|2008
|"Believe Again"
|Music Video of the Year
|

Nickelodeon Australian Kids' Choice Awards
The Nickelodeon Australian Kids' Choice Awards is an annual awards show that honours the year's biggest television, movie and music acts, as voted by the public. Goodrem has won one awards from three nominations.

|-
|2004
|Herself
|Favorite Music Act
|
|-
|2008
|Herself
|Fave Aussie
|
|-
|2008
|Herself
|Fave Female Singer
|

2017 
Herself 
Fave Aussie 
WON

Video Hits

|-
| 2003
| "Born to Try"
| Video of the Year
|

World Music Awards
The World Music Awards is an international awards show founded in 1989. Awards are presented to the World's best-selling Artists in the various categories and to the best-selling Artists from each major territory. Goodrem won the Highest Selling Australian Artist award in 2004, 2005 and 2008.

|-
| 2004
| Herself
| Highest Selling Australian Artist
| 
|-
| 2005
| Herself
| Highest Selling Australian Artist
| 
|-
| 2008
| Herself
| Highest Selling Australian Artist
| 
|-

References 

Goodrem, Delta
Awards